Apamea veterina is a moth of the family Noctuidae. It is found on the Korean Peninsula, in Hokkaido in Japan, in northeastern China, in the Russian Far East (Primorye, Khabarovsk, and Amur Oblast), and in southern Siberia (in Transbaikalia and the Altai Mountains).

Subspecies
Apamea veterina haelsseni
Apamea veterina veterina

External links
Image

Apamea (moth)
Moths of Asia
Moths described in 1853